Sir Goldsworthy Gurney (14 February 1793 – 28 February 1875) was an English surgeon, chemist, architect, builder, lecturer and consultant. He was a prototypical British gentleman scientist and inventor of the Victorian era.

Amongst many accomplishments, he developed the oxy-hydrogen blowpipe, and later applied its principles to a novel form of illumination, the Bude-Light; developed a series of early steam-powered road vehicles; and laid claim—still discussed and disputed today—to the blastpipe, a key component in the success of steam locomotives, engines, and other coal-fired systems.

Events surrounding the failure of his steam vehicle enterprise gave rise to controversy in his time, with considerable polarisation of opinion. His daughter Anna Jane Gurney (1816–1895) was devoted to him. During her lifetime, she engaged in a campaign to ensure the blastpipe was seen as his invention.

Biography

Gurney was born in St Merryn, Cornwall, England on 14 February 1793. His unusual Christian name was his grandmother's surname but taken from his godmother who was a Maid of Honour to Queen Charlotte. Gurney's grandfather married into money, allowing his father, and to an extent himself, to live as gentlemen.

He was schooled at the Grammar School at Truro, where he showed an interest in contemporary sciences; and had the opportunity through friends to meet Richard Trevithick and see his 'Puffing Devil', a full-size steam road carriage, at Camborne.

After school he took a medical education with a Dr. Avery at Wadebridge, succeeding to the whole practice in 1813, and providing him with sufficient income to marry Elizabeth Symons, a farmer's daughter from Launcells, in 1814. The couple settled in Wadebridge where their daughter Anna Jane was born in January 1815. He practised as a surgeon, but he also became interested in chemistry and mechanical science; he was also an accomplished pianist, and constructed his own piano, described as a 'large instrument'.

He moved with his family to London in 1820, apparently discontented with rural life and wishing to seek his fortune. The family settled at 7 Argyle Street, near Hanover Square, where Gurney continued his practice as a surgeon. There he expanded his scientific knowledge and started giving a series of lectures on the elements of chemical science to the Surrey Institution, where he was appointed lecturer in 1822. A son, Goldsworthy John, was also born to the couple in that year, at Launcells (later to die relatively young in 1847).

A skill attributed to Gurney was an ability to express scientific thought on paper and through lectures. His lectures in the 1822-3 period included one on the application of steam power to road vehicles. He was also of a practical bent, and in 1823 was awarded an Isis gold medal of the Royal Society of Arts for devising an oxy-hydrogen blowpipe. 

By 1825, he had started practical work on a steam carriage, taking space for a small workshop in Oxford Street and filing a first patent for "An apparatus for propelling carriages on common roads or railways – without the aid of horses, with sufficient speed for the carriage of passengers and goods". His work encompassed the development of the blastpipe, which used steam to increase the flow of air through a steam engine's chimney, so increasing the draw of air over the fire and, in short, much increasing the power-to-weight ratio of the steam engine. 

In 1826 he purchased from Jacob Perkins a manufacturing works at, and moved his family to living space in, 154 Albany Street, near Regent's Park, and proceeded to improve the designs of his carriages, described below. Whilst the carriages certainly had technical merit and much promise, he was unsuccessful in commercialising them; by the spring of 1832 he had run out of funding and was forced to auction his remaining business assets, eventually losing a great deal of his own and investors' money. The circumstances of the failure engendered controversy expressed in contemporary scientific publications, as well as in committees of the House of Commons.

In 1830, Gurney leased a plot of land overlooking Summerleaze Beach in Bude, from his friend Sir Thomas Acland, and set about the construction of a new house to be built amongst the sand hills. The construction rested on an innovative concrete raft foundation, representing an early worked example of this technique. The original house called "The Castle" still stands but has been extended over the past century. The Bude and Stratton Heritage Trust has been formed and plans are well advanced, under the Limelight Project, to raise funds to interpret the fascinating history and heritage of Bude and the surrounding area, within Bude Castle. In this period he became godfather to William Carew Hazlitt, who notes that Gurney was involved in property development in Fulham.

At The Castle, Gurney regrouped from his carriage failure, applying his mind to the principle of illumination by the forcing of oxygen into a flame to increase the brilliance of the flame, giving rise to the Bude-Light. He also applied the principles of the blastpipe or steam jet to the ventilation of mines, as well as to the extinguishing of underground fires.

His wife Elizabeth died in 1837, and is buried in St. Martin in the Fields. With his daughter – described as his constant companion – he moved to 'Reeds', a small house on the outskirts of Poughill, near Bude. In 1844 he bought a lease on Hornacott Manor, Boyton,  from Bude, where he built Wodleigh Cottage for himself, and engaged his interest in farming. In 1850 he gave up the lease on The Castle. In this period, he became a consultant, applying his innovative techniques to a range of problems, notably, after 1852, to the ventilation of the new Houses of Parliament where in 1854 he was appointed 'Inspector of Ventilation'. He had previously successfully lit parliament and Trafalgar Square.

Perhaps arising out of the Boyton farming connection he took a second wife, being married at St. Giles in the Field to Jane Betty, the 24-year-old daughter of a farmer from Sheepwash, Devon; Gurney was 61. The marriage appears to have been unsuccessful; there was perhaps some contention between Anna Jane (39) and her much younger stepmother. Jane Betty was removed from Gurney's will, although they were never divorced.

Gurney continued to divide his time between London and Cornwall, variously engaged in work with clients; experimenting and innovating in diverse fields such as heating (the Gurney Stove) or electrical conduction; and in improving his Hornacott estate. He was appointed president of the Launceston Agricultural Society.

In 1863, Gurney was knighted by Queen Victoria, but later that year suffered a paralytic stroke; he sold Hornacott and retired back to Reeds in Cornwall, where he lived with his devoted Anna Jane, ultimately passing away on 28 February 1875. He is buried at Launcells parish church.

Gurney's steam carriage

In the period 1825–9, Gurney designed and built a number of steam-powered road vehicles which were intended to commercialise a steam road transport business—the Gurney Steam Carriage Company. His vehicles were built at his Regent's Park Manufactory works, and tested around the park's barrack yard, and on frequent excursions to Hampstead, Highgate, Edgware, Barnet and Stanmore, at speeds of up to 20 miles per hour (32 km/h). Gurney is by no means the only pioneering inventor in the history of steam road vehicles – Luke Herbert, in his 1837 Practical Treatise on Rail-Roads and Locomotive Engines, rebuts in scathing fashion claims made for Gurney in preference to Trevithick as inventor of the steam carriage:

One of his vehicles was sufficiently robust to make a journey in July 1829, two months before the Rainhill Trials, from London to Bath and back, at an average speed for the return journey of 14 miles per hour—including time spent in refuelling and taking on water. His daughter Anna, in a letter to The Times newspaper in December 1875, notes that "I never heard of any accident or injury to anyone with it, except in the fray at Melksham, on the noted journey to Bath, when the fair people set upon it, burnt their fingers, threw stones, and wounded poor Martyn the stoker". The vehicle had to be escorted under guard to Bath to prevent further luddism.

The steam carriage was not a commercial success. There was an understandable apprehension on the part of the public to a conveyance atop a dangerous steam boiler; seeking to overcome this objection, Gurney designed an articulated vehicle, termed the Gurney steam drag, in which a passenger carriage was tethered to and pulled by an engine. At least two of these were built and shipped to Glasgow around 1830. According to the Steam Club of Great Britain:

The remains of one of this pair rests in Glasgow Museum of Transport, to which it was presented, having been found in a barn near the Paisley Road. Again, according to the Steam Club of Great Britain, it comprises:

A regular service was established between Cheltenham and Gloucester by Sir Charles Dance, running four times daily, for a number of months and based on a fleet of three of Gurney's carriages; but the aspirations of Dance and Gurney were effectively dashed, according to Francis Maceroni in his 1836 book A Few Facts Concerning Elementary Locomotion

In 1831, Godlsworthy gave evidence to a House of Commons select committee, on the use of Steam carriages, and related tolls.

A charge of £2 was levied on each steam carriage journey, whilst the toll for a horsedrawn carriage was 2 shillings (one-twentieth of the amount). This may be contrasted with a contemporary exchequer loan to the railway developers of £100,000. Maceroni continues:

At the same time, press coverage of an accident befalling a Glasgow steam drag adversely affected the reputation of the vehicles. Gurney was bankrupted with debts of £232,000.

Sufficient was the concern about Gurney's bankruptcy, and sufficient were his contacts, that a further select committee was convened from 1831 to 1835, on Mr.Goldsworthy Gurney's Case. Its final report stated:

Lyman Horace Weeks comments in his Automobile Biographies, that

Other work

A key development of his time at the Surrey Institute was use of the oxy-hydrogen blowpipe, normally credited to Robert Hare, in which an intensely hot flame was created by burning a jet of oxygen and hydrogen together. The blowpipe was the underpinning of limelight, and Gurney was its first exponent.

According to A History of The Growth of The Steam-Engine by Robert H. Thurston, Gurney was a proponent of the ammonia engine. "In 1822… Mr. Goldsworthy Gurney, who subsequently took an active part in their introduction, stated, in his lectures, that "elementary power is capable of being applied to propel carriages along common roads with great political advantage, and the floating knowledge of the day places the object within reach." He made an ammonia engine—probably the first ever made—and worked it so successfully, that he made use of it in driving a little locomotive."

The steam-jet or blastpipe served to increase the draw of air through pipes, and was applied to improve mine and sewerage ventilation, to increase the efficiency of steam-powered stationary engines and blast furnaces, and road or rail vehicles. After the Rainhill trials of 1829, there was considerable controversy as to the genesis of this invention since it became associated in the mind of the public with George Stephenson—probably through the agency of Samuel Smiles' biography of that man. In her 1875 letter to The Times, his daughter traces the path of the idea: Gurney communicated it to Timothy Hackworth, who employed it in his Royal George locomotive, from which Stephenson allegedly took his inspiration for its inclusion in the Rocket. More recent letters acquired by the National Railway Museum suggest that, in fact, Hackworth may have discovered the idea first and/or independently; and Herbert—clearly not a fan of Gurney—seeks to debunk claims for Gurney's invention by comparing the output of Gurney's carriages with those of Trevithick. Other problems faced by Gurney's claim to have invented this is the clear use of it by Trevithick as confirmed by contemporary notes and also the patent applied for it by another party in the early 19th century.

It is reckoned that the value of property saved by the extinguishing of this fire was £200,000.

He further improved the problematical lighting of theatres which used limelight, with his invention of the Bude-Light.  Using a standard flame producer such as an oil lamp and by adding oxygen directly into the flame he produced a dramatically increased bright white light. A system of prisms and lenses distributed light to every room of his Castle house. Bude-Lights were fitted in the House of Commons—where it is said that he replaced 280 candles with three such lamps, which lit the House for sixty years until the arrival of electricity—as well as along Pall Mall and in Trafalgar Square where recently refurbished replicas of the two styles originally used can be seen.

He extended his work to lighthouse lamps, innovating in the choice of source, the use of lenses, and the introduction of identifying on-off patterns enabling seafarers to identify which lighthouse it was they saw flashing.

The Gurney Stove, another invention which he patented in 1856, was extensively used to heat a wide variety of buildings. The stove's most interesting feature is the use of external ribs to increase the surface area of the stove available for heat transfer. A number of these stoves are still in use to this day, in the cathedrals of Ely, Durham, Chester, Hereford and Peterborough.

Arising from his successes with mine ventilation he was commissioned in 1852 to improve the gas lighting, heating, and especially the ventilation systems for the new Houses of Parliament at Westminster. Although he had some success in moving air around the palace buildings, ridding the legislature of the foul smell of the Thames was beyond his skill.

Gurney worked on many other projects, with interests and patents extending from improved steam engine design, to electric telegraphy and the design of musical instruments.

Anna Jane Gurney 

Gurney's daughter Anna Jane appears to have engaged in considerable promotion of her father's claim to various of his inventions; the inscription on his gravestone reads: 

In her copy of the Dictionary of National Biography, all references to the blowpipe were amended by hand to his blowpipe.

In 1880 she donated £500 to memorialise "his" Steam Jet, at the stone-laying ceremony for Truro Cathedral, somehow managing to rope the children of the then Prince of Wales to present the money. (The Prince of Wales, HRH Prince Albert Edward was timidly asked whether he minded, and replied "Oh, why not? The boys would stand on their heads if she wished."). Anna Jane's subscription read:

A chiming clock presented by her in 1889 to St Olaf's Church, Poughill, in Bude, was inscribed "His inventions and discoveries in steam and electricity rendered transport by land and sea so rapid that it became necessary for all England to keep uniform clock time".

A final Anna Jane tribute was a stained glass window in St. Margaret's, Westminster (destroyed during the Second World War), with an inscription part of which reads:

Publications
Lectures on the Elements of Chemical Science

See also

Timeline of hydrogen technologies

Notes

References

Further reading

External links
 Sir Goldsworthy Gurney from The Building Engineering Services Heritage Group, from which an early version of this article was derived
 The Mirror of Literature, Amusement, and Instruction, Vol. 10, No. 287, 15 December 1827, from Project Gutenberg, in which there is contemporaneous article on Gurney's steam carriage.
 Review of The Life and Times of Sir Goldsworthy Gurney from the Lehigh University Press
 Iron Horse of Fable?—Article on Gurney's Steam Drag from the Steam Car Club of Britain
 Mr. Goldsworthy Gurney's case—details of the select committee enquiry, from the British Official Publications Collaborative Reader Information Service
 Sir Goldsworthy Gurney—biography from the University of Houston
 Bude Stratton Museum has exhibits relating to Gurney

1793 births
1875 deaths
People from Padstow
Inventors from Cornwall
Scientists from Cornwall
19th-century British chemists
English physicists
19th-century British inventors
Locomotive builders and designers
People of the Industrial Revolution
Independent scientists
Experimental physicists
Steam buses
Steam road vehicles
Burials in Cornwall
Knights Bachelor